A Man Four-Square is a lost 1926 American silent Western film directed by Roy William Neill and starring Buck Jones, Marion Harlan and Harry Woods.

Cast
 Buck Jones as Craig Norton 
 Marion Harlan as Polly 
 Harry Woods as Ben Taylor 
 W.E. Lawrence as Jim Clanton 
 Jay Hunt as Polly's Father 
 Sidney Bracey as Homer Webb 
 Florence Gilbert as Bertie Roberts 
 Frank Beal as Wallace Roberts

References

Bibliography
 Solomon, Aubrey. The Fox Film Corporation, 1915-1935: A History and Filmography. McFarland, 2011.

External links
 

1926 films
1926 Western (genre) films
Fox Film films
Films directed by Roy William Neill
American black-and-white films
Silent American Western (genre) films
1920s English-language films
1920s American films